The 1923 Kentucky Wildcats football team was an American football team that represented the University of Kentucky as a member of the Southern Conference (SoCon) during the 1923 college football season. Led by Jack Winn in his first and only season as head coach, the team compiled an overall record of  4–3–2 with a mark of 0–2–2 in conference play, placing 17th in the SoCon.

Schedule

References

Kentucky
Kentucky Wildcats football seasons
Kentucky Wildcats football